Sir Edward Norman Baker, KCSI (23 March 1857 – 28 March 1913) was a British colonial officer who became Lieutenant-Governor of Bengal.

The son of Arthur Baker, he was educated at Christ's College, Finchley, and joined the Indian Civil Service, going to Bengal in 1878. He served on the Bengal Legislative Council from 1898 to 1902. From 1908 to 1911 he was Lieutenant-Governor of Bengal. In retirement he was an ordinary member of the Council of India.

References

Lieutenant-governors of Bengal
Indian Civil Service (British India) officers
1857 births
1913 deaths
Members of the Council of India